Abbakumov (masculine) or Abbakumova (feminine) is a Russian last name, a variant of Abakumov. It is shared by the following people:
Timon Abbakumov, member of FC Mordovia Saransk youth team
Vladimir Abbakumov, one of the people responsible for puppets and decorations in Lefty, a 1964 Soviet movie

See also
Abakumovo, several rural localities in Russia
Abbakumovo, several rural localities in Russia

References

Notes

Sources
И. М. Ганжина (I. M. Ganzhina). "Словарь современных русских фамилий" (Dictionary of Modern Russian Last Names). Москва, 2001. 

Russian-language surnames
